Norman Creek is a stream in Dent  and Phelps counties in the Ozarks of Missouri.

Norman Creek has the name of the local Norman family.

See also
List of rivers of Missouri

References

Rivers of Dent County, Missouri
Rivers of Phelps County, Missouri
Rivers of Missouri
Tributaries of the Meramec River